Carl Christoffer Lundquist (born 1970) is a Swedish musician and producer. He was once in the band Brainpool, where he started as a bass player and backing vocalist, but moved to play both the bass and the guitar. Brainpool won a Swedish Grammy in 1994 (best new band). He has also produced albums by Roxette, Per Gessle and Gyllene Tider and played bass and backing vocals in Roxette and participated in Gessle's solo projects.

He has his own studio in the rural south of Sweden, The Aerosol Grey Machine Studio (AGM) in Vallarum, Scania. The AGM is primarily an analogue studio with much vintage equipment and two live echo chambers. Since its start in 1998, the AGM has hosted a vast selection of both Swedish and international artists like Roxette, Per Gessle, Ed Harcourt, Ulf Lundell, Gyllene Tider, Thåström, Bo Sundström, Wilmer X, Christian Kjellvander, Helena Josefsson, Sandy Mouche, Peter von Poehl, Edda Magnason, and Moneybrother.

In May 2011, Lundquist released his debut solo album, Through the Window, which reached #29 on the Swedish album chart. All the songs on the album were co-written with songwriter Michael Saxell. Also in May, Lundquist was the first person ever to be awarded the Sir George Martin Award at a gala event in Malmö, Sweden. The award came with SEK100,000.

Discography
Through the Window (2011)

References

Swedish male musicians
Swedish record producers
1970 births
Living people